Oncidium maculatum is a species of orchid occurring from Mexico to Central America.

Synonyms
Cyrtochilum maculatum Lindl. is the basionym. Other synonyms include:
Oncidium funereum Lex.
Cyrtochilum maculatum var. ecornutum Hook.
Cyrtochilum maculatum var. parviflorum Lindl.
Odontoglossum lindleyi Galeotti ex Lindl.
Oncidium maculatum var. psittacinum Rchb.f. ex Lindl.
Oncidium psittacinum Linden ex Lindl.
Oncidium tigrinum Lindl.
Oncidium lintriculus Kraenzl.
Oncidium sawyeri L.O.Williams
Odontoglossum johnsonorum L.O.Williams

maculatum
Orchids of Central America
Orchids of Mexico